Charles P. de Saint-Aignan (born 16 February 1977, Paris) is an American software engineer who works for IBM on the IBM Watson project. He graduated from St. Paul's School (Concord, New Hampshire), in 1995, followed by Brown University (Providence, Rhode Island), in 1999.

In 1994, Charles worked for Ted Bowell at Lowell Observatory, where he discovered a number of asteroids. He named his first discovery, 8710 Hawley, after Walter N. Hawley, who was his high school physics and astronomy teacher.

The minor planet 5995 Saint-Aignan was named in his honor on the occasion of his 20th birthday.

Relatives 

Brother of Gregory, of CG Partners. Cousin of Stéphanie, of Stéphanie de Saint-Aignan Parfums.

References 
 

1977 births
Living people
20th-century  American  astronomers
American software engineers
Brown University alumni
Discoverers of asteroids

IBM employees
Scientists from Paris